Kosmos 123 ( meaning Cosmos 123), also known as DS-P1-Yu No.5 was a Soviet satellite which was used as a radar calibration target for tests of anti-ballistic missiles. It was built by the Yuzhnoye Design Bureau, and launched in 1966 as part of the Dnepropetrovsk Sputnik programme.

A Kosmos-2I 63S1 carrier rocket was used to launch Kosmos 123. The launch occurred from Site 86/1 at Kapustin Yar, at 05:31 GMT on 8 July 1966. and following its successful arrival in orbit the spacecraft received its Kosmos designation; along with the International Designator 1966-061A and the Satellite Catalog Number 02295.

It decayed from orbit on 10 December 1966. Kosmos 123 was the sixth of seventy-nine DS-P1-Yu satellites to be launched, and the fifth of seventy-two to successfully reach orbit.

See also

 1966 in spaceflight

References

Spacecraft launched in 1966
Kosmos 0123
1966 in the Soviet Union
Dnepropetrovsk Sputnik program